The 1986–87 Oregon State Beavers men's basketball team represented Oregon State University in Corvallis, Oregon in the 1986–87 season.

Led by Ralph Miller, in his 17th season at Oregon State, the Beavers would finish with a record of 19–11 (10–8 Pac-10). The Beavers were invited to the 1987 NIT, where they lost in the second round to Cal.

Roster

Schedule and results

|-
!colspan=12 style=| Non-conference regular season

|-
!colspan=12 style=| Pac-10 regular season

|-
!colspan=12 style=| Pac-10 Tournament

|-
!colspan=12 style=| National Invitation Tournament

Sources

Awards and honors
José Ortiz – Pac-10 Player of the Year and AP All-American (Honorable Mention)

References

Oregon State
Oregon State Beavers men's basketball seasons
Oregon State
Oregon State
Oregon State